Mareks Mejeris (born 2 September 1991) is a Latvian professional basketball player for Hapoel Jerusalem of the Israeli Basketball Premier League, who plays the small forward and power forward position.

Professional career
He started his pro career in 2009 with his hometown team BK Liepājas Lauvas. After a couple of seasons in Liepāja, he moved to Spain. His first team abroad was CB Clavijo from LEB Gold, where he played for two seasons. After the 2012-13 season, Mejeris went to the United States for NBA pre-draft workouts, and although going undrafted, he performed well and earned feedback of being "two years from being NBA-ready".

In August 2013, he signed with Fuenlabrada of the Liga ACB. Mid-season, he was loaned to Ford Burgos, helping the team to win the LEB Gold playoffs and earn promotion to Liga ACB.

On July 15, 2014, he signed with VEF Rīga of the Latvian League.  Mejeris finished the season strong by helping VEF Rīga win the LBL championship while being named the MVP of the LBL playoffs. In May 2017, Mejeris guided VEF to one more domestic championship, getting named Latvian League playoffs MVP once again.

On August 13, 2019, he signed with Parma Basket of the VTB United League. In 2019-20 he averaged 10.2 points, 6.8 rebounds, 0.8 steals, and 0.8 blocks per game. Playing for the team again in 2020-21, he averaged 9.0 points, 5.0 rebounds, 0.9 steals, and 0.9 blocks per game.

On March 9, 2022, he signed with Victoria Libertas Pesaro of the Italian Lega Basket Serie A (LBA).

On August 4, 2022, he signed with Hapoel Jerusalem of the Israeli Premier League.

National team career
He represented Latvia national team in EuroBasket 2011, Eurobasket 2013 and EuroBasket 2015.

References

External links
 FIBA Europe profile

1991 births
Living people
Baloncesto Fuenlabrada players
BK Liepājas Lauvas players
BK VEF Rīga players
CB Clavijo players
Élan Chalon players
Hapoel Jerusalem B.C. players
Latvian expatriate basketball people in Spain
Latvian men's basketball players
Liga ACB players
Parma Basket players
Power forwards (basketball)
Small forwards
Sportspeople from Liepāja